Vingåkers VK is a volleyball club in Vingåker, Sweden, established in 1972. In 2003 the club played the Swedish men's national championship finals against Örkelljunga VK.

References

External links
Official website 

1972 establishments in Sweden
Sport in Södermanland County
Volleyball clubs established in 1972
Swedish volleyball clubs